Centeterus is a genus of parasitoid wasps belonging to the family Ichneumonidae.

The species of this genus are found in Europe and Northern America.

Species:
 Centeterus alpinus (Cameron, 1885) 
 Centeterus balearicus (Kriechbaumer, 1894)

References

Ichneumonidae
Ichneumonidae genera